Malgobek (Maghalbike) is a town in the Republic of Ingushetia, Russia, located  northwest of the republic's capital of Magas. Population:

History
In 1934, the selo of Voznesenskoye was granted work settlement status. It served then recently discovered oilfields, on the territory of former Ingush villages of Malgobek-Balka and Chechen-Balka. Town status was granted to it in 1939.

During World War II, Malgobek was occupied by the German forces from Saturday, September 12, 1942 to January 3, 1943, when it was recaptured by the Red Army. In October 2007, Malgobek was conferred the status of City of Military Glory by President Vladimir Putin for heroically stopping the German forces at its borders.

In the 1990s, the town's population doubled due to an influx of refugees from the neighboring war-torn Chechen Republic.

Administrative and municipal status
Within the framework of administrative divisions, Malgobek serves as the administrative center of Malgobeksky District, even though it is not a part of it. As an administrative division, it is incorporated separately as the town of republic significance of Malgobek—an administrative unit with the status equal to that of the districts. As a municipal division, the town of republic significance of Malgobek is incorporated as Malgobek Urban Okrug.

Economy
Besides the oil activities of the company Ingushneftegazprom, the town's industry includes woodworking and food related industries.

Climate
Malgobek has a humid continental climate (Köppen climate classification: Dfa).

Notable people
 Muslim Evloev (1995 – 2020), Russian naturalized Kyrgyzstani freestyle wrestler

References

Notes

Sources

Bibliography 
 

Cities and towns in Ingushetia
1939 establishments in Russia
Populated places established in 1939